Burnwynd is a village on the border between the City of Edinburgh and West Lothian, Scotland. It is situated on the A71 road. Burnwynd is home to approximately twenty houses and also Hatton Tennis Club. Old documents also place Robert Burns in Burnwynd on several trips out of Edinburgh.

References

External links

Canmore - Hatton House site record

Villages in West Lothian